Group D of UEFA Euro 1996 was one of four groups in the final tournament's initial group stage. It began on 9 June and was completed on 19 June. The group consisted of defending champions Denmark, Portugal, Croatia and Turkey.

Portugal won the group and advanced to the quarter-finals, along with Croatia. Denmark and Turkey failed to advance.

Teams

Standings

In the quarter-finals,
The winner of Group D, Portugal, advanced to play the runner-up of Group C, Czech Republic.
The runner-up of Group D, Croatia, advanced to play the winner of Group C, Germany.

Matches

Denmark vs Portugal

Turkey vs Croatia

Portugal vs Turkey

Croatia vs Denmark

Croatia vs Portugal

Turkey vs Denmark

References

External links
UEFA Euro 1996 Group D

Group D
Turkey at UEFA Euro 1996
Portugal at UEFA Euro 1996
Croatia at UEFA Euro 1996
Group